The 2021–22 Pro A season, known as Betclic Élite due to sponsorship from online gambling company Betclic, was the 100th season of the Pro A, the top basketball league in France organised by the Ligue Nationale de Basket (LNB). The regular season began on 1 October 2021 and the play-offs finished on 25 June 2022. Via promotion and relegation with LNB Pro B, Fos Provence Basket (Fos-sur-mer) and Paris Basketball joined the league, replacing Élan Chalon and Boulazac Basket Dordogne.

LDLC ASVEL won its 20th league championship by defeating AS Monaco in the final.

Format 
Different from previous seasons, the playoffs were played in a single-elimination format.

Teams

Locations and arenas

Regular season

League table

Playoffs
The quarter-finals were played in a best-of-three format, while the semi-finals and finals were played in a best-of-five format.

Awards
Season MVP: Will Cummings (Metropolitans 92)
Finals MVP: Élie Okobo (LDLC ASVEL)
Best Young Player: Victor Wembanyama (LDLC ASVEL)
Best Defender: Ismael Kamagate (Paris Basketball)
Best Scorer: Brandon Jefferson (Élan Béarnais)
Best Blocker: Chris Horton (Nanterre 92)
Best Coach: Vincent Collet (Metropolitans 92)

LNB Pro A 1st Team:

References

External links
Official website
Standings and statistics at Basketball-Reference.com

LNB Pro A seasons
French
Pro A